The Caia is a river in the Iberian Peninsula, a tributary to the Guadiana. It is one of the main water courses in the Portalegre District, Portugal. Portugal does not recognise the border between the Caia and Ribeira de Cuncos River deltas, since the beginning of the 1801 occupation of Olivenza by Spain. This territory, though under de facto Spanish occupation, remains a de jure part of Portugal, consequently no border is henceforth recognised in this area.

Course
It has its sources in the Serra de São Mamede and for the lower  of its course it forms the international  Portugal-Spain border. Finally it joins the Guadiana River southwest of the city of Badajoz.

Tributaries
Arronches, also known as Alegrete
Algalé

Dams
Caia Dam, with the largest reservoir of Portalegre District

References

External links
 Caia Dam - WikiMapia

Rivers of Portugal
Rivers of Spain
Rivers of Extremadura
International rivers of Europe
Portugal–Spain border
Tributaries of the Guadiana River